The 2010 Chinese census, officially the Sixth National Population Census of the People's Republic of China (中华人民共和国第六次全国人口普查), was conducted by the National Bureau of Statistics of the People's Republic of China with a zero hour of November 1, 2010.

Census procedure
Census procedure was governed by the Regulations on National Population Census and the Circular of the State Council on the Conduct of the 6th National Population Census. The census cost 700 million RMB.

Results
The main findings of the census were published on April 28, 2011.

Total population

It found the total population of Mainland China to be 1,339,724,852 persons, an increase of 73,899,804 persons from the previous census conducted in 2000. This represented a growth rate of 5.84% over the decade, and an average annual growth rate of 0.57%. The population undercount rate of the census was estimated at 0.12%. The census also listed the population of Hong Kong Special Administrative Region as 7,097,600 persons, the population of Macau Special Administrative Region as 552,300 persons, and the population of Taiwan as 23,162,123 persons.

Population composition and demographics

The census found a total of 401,517,330 family households in Mainland China, with an average of 3.10 persons per household, a decrease of 0.34 persons from the 2000 census. 51.27% of the population is male, and 48.73% is female, giving a male to female ratio of 105.20 men for every 100 women, a decrease from the 2000 figure of 106.74. 49.68% of the population resided in urban areas, and 50.32% resided in rural areas, an increase of 13.46% in the proportion of the urban population. 261,386,075 people had lived in a place different from their household registration for at least six months, with 221,426,652 of these living in a different city from their registration.

According to the 2010 census, males account for 51.27% of China's 1.34 billion people, while females made up 48.73% of the total. The sex ratio (the number of males for each female in a population) at birth was 118.06 boys to every 100 girls (54.14%) in 2010.

16.60% of the population was aged 0–14, 70.14% was aged 15–59, and 13.26% were aged 60 or over. This represented a decrease of 6.29% in the share of the population in the youngest age group, and increases of 3.36% and 2.93% for the 15-59 and 60+ shares, respectively. 91.51% of the population was of the Han Chinese nationality, and 8.49% was of other ethnic groups. The Han population increased by 5.74%, and the population of other groups increased by a combined 6.92%.

Educational attainment
The census found that, in Mainland China, 119,636,790 people had completed higher education, 187,985,979 had completed only senior secondary education, 519,656,445 had completed only junior secondary education, 358,764,003 had completed only primary education, and 54,656,573 were illiterate. Since 2000, out of every 100,000 people, the number with higher education has increased from 3,611 to 8,930, the number with senior secondary education has increased from 11,146 to 14,032, the number with junior secondary education increased from 33,961 to 38,788, and the number of people with only primary education decreased from 35,701 to 26,779. The illiteracy rate declined from 6.72% to 4.08%.

Population distribution

Foreign nationals and residents of Hong Kong, Macau and Taiwan

The census also recorded 593,832 foreign nationals, 234,829 residents of Hong Kong SAR, 21,201 residents of Macau SAR, and 170,283 residents of Taiwan residing in Mainland China, a total of 1,020,145 additional persons. 605,821 of these were male, and 414,324 were female. Of the foreign nationals, 120,750 were from the Republic of Korea, 71,493 were from the United States, 66,159 were from Japan, 39,776 were from Myanmar, 36,205 were from Vietnam, 19,990 were from Canada, 15,087 were from France, 15,051 were from India, 14,446 were from Germany, and 13,286 were from Australia. The remaining 181,589 were from other countries.

Naturalisation 

According to The Economist, China had only 1,448 naturalised Chinese in total at the 2010 census.

See also
 Census in China

References

External links 
 
 
 

2010
2010 in China
China